Charles "Charlie" Paul Logg Jr. (born February 24, 1931) is an American rower who competed in the 1952 Summer Olympics. He was born in Princeton, New Jersey. In 1952, he won the gold medal with his partner Tom Price in the coxless pairs event.

External links
 

1931 births
Living people
Rowers at the 1952 Summer Olympics
Olympic gold medalists for the United States in rowing
People from Princeton, New Jersey
American male rowers
Medalists at the 1952 Summer Olympics
Pan American Games medalists in rowing
Pan American Games silver medalists for the United States
Rowers at the 1955 Pan American Games
Medalists at the 1955 Pan American Games